Immaculate Heart of Mary School may refer to:

Australia
Immaculate Heart of Mary School (South Australia), a school in South Australia

Canada
Immaculate Heart of Mary School (Winnipeg)

China

United Kingdom
Sacred Heart of Mary Girls' School, London

United States
Cantwell-Sacred Heart of Mary High School, Montebello, California
Immaculate Heart of Mary School (Marche, Arkansas), listed on the National Register of Historic Places
Immaculate Heart of Mary School (Massachusetts), near Harvard, Massachusetts